Oiling may refer to;

 Oiling (leather processing)
 Applying a drying oil finish to wooden items
 Lubrication of mechanical parts with oil